The Zealot Temple siege (68 AD) was a short siege of the Temple in Jerusalem fought between Jewish factions during the First Jewish–Roman War (66–70 AD). According to the historian Josephus, the forces of Ananus ben Ananus, one of the heads of the Judean provisional government and former High Priest of Israel, besieged the Zealots who held the Temple. When John of Giscala led the Zealots to believe that Ananus had contacted the Roman General Vespasian for assistance in retaking control of all Jerusalem, the Zealots, driven to desperation, asked the Edomites (Idumeans) for assistance in preventing the delivery of the city to the Romans. When the Edomites arrived, the Zealots opened the gates of Jerusalem to them, and the Edomites slaughtered ben Hanan's (Ananus ben Ananus) forces, killing him as well. 

After freeing the Zealots from the Temple, the Edomites and Zealots massacred the common people. Jerusalem mostly remained in the control of the Zealots until 70 AD, when it was sacked by Rome and the Temple was destroyed.

Background
The Zealots were a political movement in 1st century Judaism that sought to incite the people of Judaea Province to rebel against the Roman Empire and expel it from the Holy Land by force of arms. The First Jewish–Roman War began in the year 66 AD with Greek and Jewish religious tensions and expanded into anti-taxation protests and Jewish attacks upon Roman citizens. However, by the year 68, Jewish resistance in the North had been crushed and the Roman General Vespasian had established his headquarters at Caesarea Maritima. The leaders of the collapsed Northern revolt, John of Giscala and Simon Bar Giora, managed to escape to Jerusalem, but brutal civil war erupted as the Zealots and the fanatical Sicarii executed anyone advocating surrender.

Siege
In 68 AD, there was growing unrest in Jerusalem. Ananus ben Ananus incited the people to rise up against the Zealots, who were robbing the people and using the Temple of Jerusalem as their base of operations. Ben Hanan began to recruit for armed conflict. The Zealots, who were quartered in the Temple, learned that ben Hanan was preparing for battle, and sallied forth, attacking all in their way. Ben Hanan quickly organized the people against them. The skirmish began with the belligerents throwing rocks at one another, then javelins, then finally hand-to-hand combat with swords ensued. Eventually the Zealots retreated to the inner court of the Temple, and 6,000 of Ben Hanan's men held the first (outer) court.

According to Josephus, John of Giscala, who secretly sought to rule Jerusalem, had cultivated a friendship with Ananus:

John was suspected of being a spy, and so was made to swear an "oath of goodwill" to Ananus ben Ananus and the people. After swearing the oath, Ananus sent John of Giscala into the inner court, to speak with the Zealots on his behalf. John immediately turned coat, "as if his oath had been made to the zealots," telling them that they were in imminent danger, and could not survive a siege. He told them that they had two options: 1) to surrender, in which case they'd either face execution, vigilantism, or retribution for the "desperate things they had done"; or 2) to ask for outside assistance. John told the Zealots that Ananus had sent ambassadors to Vespasian to ask him to come take the city. This in fact was not true, but convinced them that they could not endure a siege without help.

The messengers managed to sneak out of the Temple and successfully deliver their message to the rulers of the Edomites, who were greatly alarmed, and quickly raised an army of 20,000 to march on Jerusalem, "in order to maintain the liberty of their metropolis." Upon receiving word that 20,000 Edomites were marching on Jerusalem, ben Hanan ordered the gates shut against them, and the walls guarded. Jesus, one of the elder high priests, made a speech from the walls, denouncing the Zealots as robbers and telling the Edomites to throw down their arms. Simon, son of Cathlas, one of Idumean commanders, quieted the tumult of his own men and answered: "I can no longer wonder that the patrons of liberty are under custody in the temple, since there are those that shut the gates of our common city to their own nation, and at the same time are prepared to admit the Romans into it; nay, perhaps are disposed to crown the gates with garlands at their coming, while they speak to the Idumeans from their own towers, and enjoin them to throw down their arms which they have taken up for the preservation of its liberty. . . ."

That night a thunderstorm blew over Jerusalem, and the Zealots sneaked from the Temple to the gates, and cut the bars of the gates with saws, the sound masked by the sound of the wind and thunder. They opened the gates of Jerusalem to the Edomites, who fell upon the guards and made their way to the Temple. They slaughtered Ananus' forces there, killing him as well. After freeing the Zealots from the Temple, they massacred the common people. Eventually, after learning that Vespasian had never been contacted by Ananus ben Ananus, the Edomites repented and left the city.

Aftermath
Jerusalem remained in the hands of the Zealots until the Siege of Jerusalem (70 AD) by Roman legions under Titus resulted in the sack of the city and the capture and imprisonment of Zealot leaders.

See also
 Josephus

References

External links
 Timeline of Jewish-Roman Wars, including Temple Siege

Jews and Judaism in the Roman Empire
Military history of Jerusalem
First Jewish–Roman War
60s conflicts
68
Israel in the Roman era
60s in the Roman Empire
Second Temple